Microbacterium barkeri is a bacterium from the genus Microbacterium which has been isolated from domestic sewage and from smear from a cheeses. Microbacterium barkeri has the ability to degrade polyvinyl alcohol.

References

Further reading

External links
Type strain of Microbacterium barkeri at BacDive -  the Bacterial Diversity Metadatabase	

Bacteria described in 1983
barkeri